In quantum mechanics, Schrödinger's cat is a thought experiment that illustrates a paradox of quantum superposition. In the thought experiment, a hypothetical cat may be considered simultaneously both alive and dead, while it is unobserved in a closed box, as a result of its fate being linked to a random subatomic event that may or may not occur. This thought experiment was devised by physicist Erwin Schrödinger in 1935 in a discussion with Albert Einstein to illustrate what Schrödinger saw as the problems of the Copenhagen interpretation of quantum mechanics. 

In Schrödinger's original formulation, a cat, a flask of poison, and a radioactive source are placed in a sealed box. If an internal monitor (e.g. a Geiger counter) detects radioactivity (i.e. a single atom decaying), the flask is shattered, releasing the poison, which kills the cat. The Copenhagen interpretation implies that, after a while, the cat is simultaneously alive and dead. Yet, when one looks in the box, one sees the cat either alive or dead, not both alive and dead. This poses the question of when exactly quantum superposition ends and reality resolves into one possibility or the other.

Though originally a critique on the Copenhagen interpretation, Schrödinger's seemingly paradoxical thought experiment became part of the foundation of quantum mechanics. The scenario is often featured in theoretical discussions of the interpretations of quantum mechanics, particularly in situations involving the measurement problem.  The experiment is not intended to be actually performed on a cat, but rather as an easily understandable illustration of the behavior of atoms. As a result, Schrödinger's cat has had enduring appeal in popular culture. Experiments at the atomic scale have been carried out, showing that very small objects may be superimposed; superimposing an object as large as a cat would pose considerable technical difficulties.

Fundamentally, the Schrödinger's cat experiment asks how long superpositions last and when (or whether) they collapse. Interpretations for resolving this question include that the cat is dead or alive when the box is opened (Copenhagen); that a conscious mind must observe the box (Von Neumann–Wigner); that upon observation the universe branches into a universe where the cat is alive, and one where it is dead (many-worlds); that every object (such as the cat, and the box itself) is an observer, but superposition is relative depending on the observer (relational); that superposition never truly exists due to time-travelling waves (transactional); that merely observing the box either slows or accelerates the cat's death (quantum Zeno effect); among other theories which assert that the cat is dead or alive long before the box is opened. It is unclear which interpretation is correct; the underlying issue raised by Schrödinger's cat remains an unsolved problem in physics.

Origin and motivation 

Schrödinger intended his thought experiment as a discussion of the EPR article—named after its authors Einstein, Podolsky, and Rosen—in 1935. The EPR article highlighted the counterintuitive nature of quantum superpositions, in which a quantum system such as an atom or photon can exist as a combination of multiple states corresponding to different possible outcomes.

The prevailing theory, called the Copenhagen interpretation, says that a quantum system remains in superposition until it interacts with, or is observed by the external world. When this happens, the superposition collapses into one or another of the possible definite states. The EPR experiment shows that a system with multiple particles separated by large distances can be in such a superposition. Schrödinger and Einstein exchanged letters about Einstein's EPR article, in the course of which Einstein pointed out that the  state of an unstable keg of gunpowder will, after a while, contain a superposition of both exploded and unexploded states.

To further illustrate, Schrödinger described how one could, in principle, create a superposition in a large-scale system by making it dependent on a quantum particle that was in a superposition.  He proposed a scenario with a cat in a locked steel chamber, wherein the cat's life or death depended on the state of a radioactive atom, whether it had decayed and emitted radiation or not. According to Schrödinger, the Copenhagen interpretation implies that the cat remains both alive and dead until the state has been observed. Schrödinger did not wish to promote the idea of dead-and-live cats as a serious possibility; on the contrary, he intended the example to illustrate the absurdity of the existing view of quantum mechanics.
The idea that quantum superpositions of macroscopic states could be possible led to the Many-worlds interpretation of quantum theory.

Since Schrödinger's time, various interpretations of the mathematics of quantum mechanics have been advanced by physicists, some of which regard the "alive and dead" cat superposition as quite real, others do not. Intended as a critique of the Copenhagen interpretation (the prevailing orthodoxy in 1935), the Schrödinger's cat thought experiment remains a touchstone for modern interpretations of quantum mechanics and can be used to illustrate and compare their strengths and weaknesses.

Thought experiment 

Schrödinger wrote:

Schrödinger's famous thought experiment poses the question, "when does a quantum system stop existing as a superposition of states and become one or the other?"  (More technically, when does the actual quantum state stop being a non-trivial linear combination of states, each of which resembles different classical states, and instead begin to have a unique classical description?) If the cat survives, it remembers only being alive. But explanations of the EPR experiments that are consistent with standard microscopic quantum mechanics require that macroscopic objects, such as cats and notebooks, do not always have unique classical descriptions. The thought experiment illustrates this apparent paradox. Our intuition says that no observer can be in more than one state simultaneously—yet the cat, it seems from the thought experiment, can be in such a condition. Is the cat required to be an observer, or does its existence in a single well-defined classical state require another external observer? Each alternative seemed absurd to Einstein, who was impressed by the ability of the thought experiment to highlight these issues. In a letter to Schrödinger dated 1950, he wrote:

Note that the charge of gunpowder is not mentioned in Schrödinger's setup, which uses a Geiger counter as an amplifier and hydrocyanic poison instead of gunpowder. The gunpowder had been mentioned in Einstein's original suggestion to Schrödinger 15 years before, and Einstein carried it forward to the present discussion.

Interpretations 
Since Schrödinger's time, other interpretations of quantum mechanics have been proposed that give different answers to the questions posed by Schrödinger's cat of how long superpositions last and when (or whether) they collapse.

Copenhagen interpretation 

A commonly held interpretation of quantum mechanics is the Copenhagen interpretation.  In the Copenhagen interpretation, a system stops being a superposition of states and becomes either one or the other when an observation takes place. This thought experiment makes apparent the fact that the nature of measurement, or observation, is not well-defined in this interpretation. The experiment can be interpreted to mean that while the box is closed, the system simultaneously exists in a superposition of the states "decayed nucleus/dead cat" and "undecayed nucleus/living cat", and that only when the box is opened and an observation performed does the wave function collapse into one of the two states.

Von Neumann interpretation

In 1932 John von Neumann described in his book Mathematical Foundations a pattern where the radioactive source is observed by a device, which itself is observed by another device, and so on. It makes no difference in the predictions of quantum theory where along this chain of causal effects the superposition collapses. This potentially infinite chain could be broken if the last device is replaced by a conscious observer. This solved the problem because it was claimed that an individual's consciousness cannot be multiple. Neumann asserted that a conscious observer is necessary for collapse to one or the other (e.g. either a live cat or a dead cat) of the terms on the right-hand side of a wave function. This interpretation was later adopted by Eugene Wigner, who then rejected the interpretation in a thought experiment known as Wigner's friend.

Wigner supposed that a friend opened the box and observed the cat without telling anyone. From Wigner's conscious perspective, the friend is now part of the wave function and has seen a live cat and seen a dead cat. To a third person's conscious perspective, Wigner himself becomes part of the wave function once Wigner learns the outcome from the friend. This could be extended indefinitely.

Bohr's interpretation
One of the main scientists associated with the Copenhagen interpretation, Niels Bohr, offered an interpretation that is independent of a subjective observer-induced collapse of the wave function, or of measurement; instead, an "irreversible" or effectively irreversible process causes the decay of quantum coherence which imparts the classical behavior of "observation" or "measurement". Thus, Schrödinger's cat would be either dead or alive long before the box is observed.

A resolution of the paradox is that the triggering of the Geiger counter counts as a measurement of the state of the radioactive substance. Because a measurement has already occurred deciding the state of the cat, the subsequent observation by a human records only what has already occurred. Analysis of an actual experiment by Roger Carpenter and A. J. Anderson found that measurement alone (for example by a Geiger counter) is sufficient to collapse a quantum wave function before any human knows of the result. The apparatus indicates one of two colors depending on the outcome. The human observer sees which color is indicated, but they don't consciously know which outcome the color represents. A second human, the one who set up the apparatus, is told of the color and becomes conscious of the outcome, and the box is opened to check if the outcome matches. However, it is disputed whether merely observing the color counts as a conscious observation of the outcome.

Many-worlds interpretation and consistent histories 

In 1957, Hugh Everett formulated the many-worlds interpretation of quantum mechanics, which does not single out observation as a special process. In the many-worlds interpretation, both alive and dead states of the cat persist after the box is opened, but are decoherent from each other. In other words, when the box is opened, the observer and the possibly-dead cat split into an observer looking at a box with a dead cat, and an observer looking at a box with a live cat. But since the dead and alive states are decoherent, there is no effective communication or interaction between them.

When opening the box, the observer becomes entangled with the cat, so "observer states" corresponding to the cat's being alive and dead are formed; each observer state is entangled or linked with the cat so that the "observation of the cat's state" and the "cat's state" correspond with each other.  Quantum decoherence ensures that the different outcomes have no interaction with each other. The same mechanism of quantum decoherence is also important for the interpretation in terms of consistent histories. Only the "dead cat" or the "live cat" can be a part of a consistent history in this interpretation. Decoherence is generally considered to prevent simultaneous observation of multiple states.

A variant of the Schrödinger's cat experiment, known as the quantum suicide machine, has been proposed by cosmologist Max Tegmark. It examines the Schrödinger's cat experiment from the point of view of the cat, and argues that by using this approach, one may be able to distinguish between the Copenhagen interpretation and many-worlds.

Ensemble interpretation 

The ensemble interpretation states that superpositions are nothing but subensembles of a larger statistical ensemble. The state vector would not apply to individual cat experiments, but only to the statistics of many similarly prepared cat experiments. Proponents of this interpretation state that this makes the Schrödinger's cat paradox a trivial matter, or a non-issue.

This interpretation serves to discard the idea that a single physical system in quantum mechanics has a mathematical description that corresponds to it in any way.

Relational interpretation 

The relational interpretation makes no fundamental distinction between the human experimenter, the cat, or the apparatus, or between animate and inanimate systems; all are quantum systems governed by the same rules of wavefunction evolution, and all may be considered "observers". But the relational interpretation allows that different observers can give different accounts of the same series of events, depending on the information they have about the system. The cat can be considered an observer of the apparatus; meanwhile, the experimenter can be considered another observer of the system in the box (the cat plus the apparatus). Before the box is opened, the cat, by nature of its being alive or dead, has information about the state of the apparatus (the atom has either decayed or not decayed); but the experimenter does not have information about the state of the box contents. In this way, the two observers simultaneously have different accounts of the situation: To the cat, the wavefunction of the apparatus has appeared to "collapse"; to the experimenter, the contents of the box appear to be in superposition. Not until the box is opened, and both observers have the same information about what happened, do both system states appear to "collapse" into the same definite result, a cat that is either alive or dead.

Transactional interpretation 

In the transactional interpretation the apparatus emits an advanced wave backward in time, which combined with the wave that the source emits forward in time, forms a standing wave.  The waves are seen as physically real, and the apparatus is considered an "observer".  In the transactional interpretation, the collapse of the wavefunction is "atemporal" and occurs along the whole transaction between the source and the apparatus.  The cat is never in superposition.  Rather the cat is only in one state at any particular time, regardless of when the human experimenter looks in the box. The transactional interpretation resolves this quantum paradox.

Zeno effects 

The Zeno effect is known to cause delays to any changes from the initial state.

On the other hand, the anti-Zeno effect accelerates the changes. For example, if you peek a look into the cat box frequently you may either cause delays to the fateful choice or, conversely, accelerate it.  Both the Zeno effect and the anti-Zeno effect are real and known to happen to real atoms. The quantum system being measured must be strongly coupled to the surrounding environment (in this case to the apparatus, the experiment room ... etc.) in order to obtain more accurate information. But while there is no information passed to the outside world, it is considered to be a quasi-measurement, but as soon as the information about the cat's well-being is passed on to the outside world (by peeking into the box) quasi-measurement turns into measurement.  Quasi-measurements, like measurements, cause the Zeno effects.  Zeno effects teach us that even without peeking into the box, the death of the cat would have been delayed or accelerated anyway due to its environment.

Objective collapse theories 

According to objective collapse theories, superpositions are destroyed spontaneously (irrespective of external observation), when some objective physical threshold (of time, mass, temperature, irreversibility, etc.) is reached. Thus, the cat would be expected to have settled into a definite state long before the box is opened. This could loosely be phrased as "the cat observes itself", or "the environment observes the cat".

Objective collapse theories require a modification of standard quantum mechanics to allow superpositions to be destroyed by the process of time evolution. These theories could ideally be tested by creating mesoscopic superposition states in the experiment. For instance, energy cat states has been proposed as a precise detector of the quantum gravity related energy decoherence models.

Applications and tests 

The experiment as described is a purely theoretical one, and the machine proposed is not known to have been constructed. However, successful experiments involving similar principles, e.g. superpositions of relatively large (by the standards of quantum physics) objects have been performed. These experiments do not show that a cat-sized object can be superposed, but the known upper limit on "cat states" has been pushed upwards by them. In many cases the state is short-lived, even when cooled to near absolute zero.
 A "cat state" has been achieved with photons.
 A beryllium ion has been trapped in a superposed state.
 An experiment involving a superconducting quantum interference device ("SQUID") has been linked to the theme of the thought experiment: "The superposition state does not correspond to a billion electrons flowing one way and a billion others flowing the other way. Superconducting electrons move en masse. All the superconducting electrons in the SQUID flow both ways around the loop at once when they are in the Schrödinger's cat state."
 A piezoelectric "tuning fork" has been constructed, which can be placed into a superposition of vibrating and non vibrating states. The resonator comprises about 10 trillion atoms.
  An experiment involving a flu virus has been proposed.
 An experiment involving a bacterium and an electromechanical oscillator has been proposed.

In quantum computing the phrase "cat state" sometimes refers to the GHZ state, wherein several qubits are in an equal superposition of all being 0 and all being 1; e.g.,

According to at least one proposal, it may be possible to determine the state of the cat before observing it.

Extensions 
Prominent physicists have gone so far as to suggest that astronomers observing dark energy in the universe in 1998 may have "reduced its life expectancy" through a pseudo-Schrödinger's cat scenario, although this is a controversial viewpoint.

In August 2020, physicists presented studies involving interpretations of quantum mechanics that are related to the Schrödinger's cat and Wigner's friend paradoxes, resulting in conclusions that challenge seemingly established assumptions about reality.

See also 

 Basis function
 Complementarity (physics)
 Double-slit experiment
 Elitzur–Vaidman bomb tester
 Heisenberg cut
 Modal realism
 Observer effect (physics)
 Schroedinbug
 Schrödinger's cat in popular culture

References

Further reading 

 
  An article on experiments with "cat state" superpositions in superconducting rings, in which the electrons go around the ring in two directions simultaneously.
 
  A description of investigations of quantum "cat states" and wave function collapse by Serge Haroche and David J. Wineland, for which they won the 2012 Nobel Prize in Physics.

External links 

 A spoken word version of this article (created from a revision of the article dated 2013-08-12).
 Schrödinger's Cat from the Information Philosopher.
 Schrödinger's Cat - Sixty Symbols - a video published by  the University of Nottingham.
 Schrödinger's Cat - a podcast produced by Sift.

 
Articles containing video clips
Fictional cats
Physical paradoxes
Quantum measurement
Thought experiments in quantum mechanics